"When Love Starts Talkin'" is a song recorded by American country music artist Wynonna.  It was released in September 1997 as the first single from the album The Other Side. The song reached number 13 on the Billboard Hot Country Singles & Tracks chart and peaked at number 6 on the RPM Country Tracks chart in Canada. It was written by Jamie O'Hara, Brent Maher, and Gary Nicholson.

Music video
The music video was directed by Bobby Roth and premiered in September 1997.

Chart performance
"When Love Starts Talkin'" debuted at number 53 on the U.S. Billboard Hot Country Singles & Tracks for the week of October 4, 1997.

References

1997 singles
Wynonna Judd songs
Songs written by Jamie O'Hara (singer)
Songs written by Gary Nicholson
Universal Records singles
Curb Records singles
Songs written by Brent Maher
Song recordings produced by Brent Maher
1997 songs